Kothangudithattimal is a village in the Kumbakonam taluk of Thanjavur district, Tamil Nadu, India.

Demographics 
As per the 2001 census, Kothangudi had a total population of 705 with 343 males and 362 females. The sex ratio was 1055. The literacy rate was 65.73.

It now appears to have a population of 811, with about 190 houses.

References

External links 
 

Villages in Thanjavur district